Coronation Park may refer to:

 Coronation Park (Toronto), a public park and memorial in Toronto, Ontario, Canada
 Coronation Park (Sunyani, Ghana), a multi-use stadium in Sunyani, Ghana
 Coronation Park, Delhi, India
 The home football stadium of Eastwood Town F.C., Nottinghamshire, England
 A public park in Woodcroft, Edmonton, Alberta, Canada
 A public park in Radcliffe, Greater Manchester, England
 A public park located in Palmerston North, New Zealand
 An area of Krugersdorp, South Africa

See also
 Centenary and Coronation Park, in Thimphu, Bhutan